The Essex County Cricket Club Tournament was an early men's grass court tennis tournament held initially at Knighton, Essex in England in 1879 and finally at Leyton in 1888.

History
The Essex County Cricket Club Tennis Tournament was an early grass court tennis tournament held initially at Knighton in England in 1879. It was part of the men's tennis tour. In 1887 the tournament was held in Leyton. In 1888 the event was staged in Chingford. In 1889 it returned to Leyton for the last time before being abolished.

Finals
The challenge round is the final round of a tournament, in which the winner of a single-elimination phase faces the previous year's champion (who plays only that one match). The challenge round was used in the early history of tennis (from 1877 through 1921), but only in some tournaments (not all).

Men's singles
Included:

Notes

References

Sources
 Abolition of Challenge Rounds". paperspast.natlib.govt.nz. EVENING POST, VOLUME CIII, ISSUE 65, 20 MARCH 1922. 
Nieuwland, Alex (2017). "Tournament – Essex County Cricket Club". www.tennisarchives.com. Harlingen, Netherlands: Idzznew BV 
 Baily's Monthly Magazine of Sports and Pastimes, and Racing Register, A.H. Baily & Company of Cornhill. London. England. 1860 to 1889.

Further reading
 Ayre's Lawn Tennis Almanack And Tournament Guide, 1908 to 1938, A. Wallis Myers. 
 British Lawn Tennis and Squash Magazine, 1948 to 1967, British Lawn Tennis Ltd, UK.
 Dunlop Lawn Tennis Almanack And Tournament Guide, G.P. Hughes, 1939 to 1958, Dunlop Sports Co. Ltd, UK
 Lawn tennis and Badminton Magazine, 1906 to 1973,  UK.
 Lowe's Lawn Tennis Annuals and Compendia, Lowe, Sir F. Gordon, Eyre & Spottiswoode
 Spalding's Lawn Tennis Annuals from 1885 to 1922, American Sports Pub. Co, USA.
 The World of Tennis Annuals , Barrett John, 1970 to 2001.

External links
http://www.tennisarchives.com/tournament/essex county cricket club

Grass court tennis tournaments
Defunct tennis tournaments in the United Kingdom
Tennis tournaments in England